Vanessa Andreu (born Vanessa Andreu Ibarra on July 18, 1979 in Mexico) is a Mexican actress, singer, hostess and reporter. Best known for a hostess and reporter of Zapping Zone for Disney Channel and Disney Planet.

Filmography

Singles

References

External links

1979 births
Living people
Mexican television actresses
Mexican television presenters
20th-century Mexican actresses
21st-century Mexican actresses
21st-century Mexican singers
21st-century Mexican women singers
Mexican women television presenters